The fifth series of The Great British Bake Off first aired on 6 August 2014, with twelve contestants. Mel Giedroyc and Sue Perkins presented the show and Mary Berry and Paul Hollywood returned as judges.  Twelve contestants competed in this series, and the competition was held in Welford Park in Berkshire. The series was won by Nancy Birtwhistle, with Luis Troyano and Richard Burr finishing as runners-up.

The programme was moved from BBC Two to BBC One starting this year, but the Masterclass episodes remained on BBC Two.  A companion series, The Great British Bake Off: An Extra Slice, hosted by comedian Jo Brand, started this year on BBC Two.

The fifth series was broadcast as the first season on PBS in the United States.

Bakers

Results summary 

Diana left the show after episode 4 due to illness. Her departure was announced at the start of episode 5. The night before episode 5 was scheduled to be taped, she suffered a head injury, resulting in an overnight stay in A&E and a loss of her senses of taste and smell that persisted.

Because the judges were unable to agree, no-one was eliminated this week.

Colour key:

Episodes

Episode 1: Cakes 
For their first bake, the contestants were required to make a Swiss Roll as their signature challenge in two and a half hours. For the technical bake, the bakers were set the challenge of baking a cherry cake in two hours using Mary Berry's recipe. In the showstopper challenge, the bakers were given three and a half hours to bake their own choice of classic British cakes in miniature. The bakers needed to make 36 cakes of identical size, shape and texture.

Episode 2: Biscuits 
In this episode, the bakers were challenged with creating biscuits. Firstly, in the signature, they had two hours to bake 36 savoury biscuits. In the technical challenge, they had one and a quarter hours with Mary Berry's recipe for 18 florentines, which the bakers found difficult. In the final challenge, the bakers had four hours to make some kind of 3D biscuit scene.

Episode 3: Bread 
In bread week, the bakers firstly had to make twelve rye bread rolls in three and a half hours. In the technical challenge, they were given three hours to make four ciabatta loaves using Paul's recipe, with the advice from Paul that they should be patient. In the showstopper, the bakers were required to make a bread centrepiece in four hours. The centrepiece should be a filled-loaf that is spectacular and tasty, and would be judged on its appearance, design and crust, and should be well-baked on the inside.

Episode 4: Desserts 
For the signature bake, the judges gave the bakers two hours to make eight self-saucing puddings, meaning the sauce should come from the bake itself. The bakers may choose to make either a fondant or a sponge which creates its own sauce at the bottom. In the technical, they had to bake Mary's own tiramisu cake recipe in two and a half hours. In the showstopper, they had four and a half hours to make baked Alaskas.

Many of the bakers struggled to make baked Alaskas, as it was the hottest day of the year so far, and two of five refrigerators were broken, resulting in a struggle among the contestants for enough freezer space. During the bake, Diana took Iain's ice cream and sponge cake assembly out of the freezer to make room for hers, mistakenly leaving it out on a counter in the hot tent. When Iain found it, the ice cream had melted and, frustrated, he threw the sponge cake and melted ice cream in the dustbin. (It was later stated by producers that the dessert was only out for one minute.) Paul and Mary chastised him for this decision, explaining that they would rather have judged sample pieces of each baked Alaska component or even a melted final product than nothing at all, and his decision to present Paul and Mary with nothing to judge contributed to his elimination. Viewers of the show objected on Twitter, attacking Diana. Iain spoke out against these online attacks, and Diana claimed that the editing had distorted the truth, "stitching [her] up". She subsequently withdrew from the show after suffering an injury from a fall.

Episode 5: Pies and Tarts 
For signature challenge, the bakers were set the task of a family-sized custard tart in two and a half hours. The tart should have a crispy base and silky custard. The technical challenge is set using one of Paul's recipes, and the bakers were required to make six mini pear pies, which are poached pears surrounded by rough puff pastry, to be completed in two hours. In the showstopper, the bakers were tasked with making tiered pies in four and half hours. The pies needed to be able to support themselves, and should have at least three tiers and share a common theme.

Before the round began, it was announced that Diana had withdrawn from the competition for health reasons; though specifics were not mentioned on air, Diana stated later that she had lost her sense of taste and smell in a fall.

Episode 6: European Cakes 
For the signature bake, the challenge was to bake a cake inspired by a European cake, but the cake had to be leavened with yeast. The bakers were given three hours for the challenge. The technical challenge was set using one of Mary's recipes for a Swedish Princess cake (Prinsesstårta). The recipe is the most complicated yet, requiring 26 separate ingredients with 14 stages, and to be completed in two and a quarter hours. For the showstopper challenge, the bakers were required to make a contemporary version of the Hungarian Dobos Torte in five hours. The cake should have at least two tiers, with particular emphasis on caramel sugar work on the cake.

No one was eliminated this week as the judges could not agree on the worst-performing baker, stating it was between Richard and Kate. As Diana left the show before the previous week's contest due to illness, it was possible not to eliminate anyone.

Episode 7: Pastry 

In their first task, the bakers were set the challenge of making twelve savoury pastry parcels, to be completed in an hour and three quarters. The parcels can be of any type of pastries, but should be uniform in size, well-filled, perfectly cooked and well-sealed to prevent leaks. The technical bake was one that for the first time none of the bakers had heard of, the Breton pastry kouign-amann, using one of Paul's recipes. The bakers should make twelve identical kouign-amanns in three and a half hours. For the final challenge, the bakers were required to make 24 Éclairs of two different flavours (12 of each) in four hours. The éclairs should be made of choux pastry and éclair-shaped, otherwise the bakers were free to do as they wished to produce a showstopper.

Episode 8: Advanced Dough 
For the signature bake, they were given the challenge of making sweet fruit loaves that must be free form. They had two and a half hours for the bake which is challenging as the bakers were required to use enriched dough which takes longer to proof. In the technical, they had two and a half hours to make a povitica, which Chetna had made for her signature loaf. This technical challenge was particularly hard for most of the bakers, many of whose loafs were raw inside and deemed unsafe to eat. Doughnuts were set as the challenge in the final task, and the bakers were required to make eighteen each of two different sorts, to be completed in four hours.

Episode 9: Pâtisserie (Semi-final) 
For the signature challenge, the bakers had to make baklava, including their own filo pastry, with a time limit of three and a half hours to complete the challenge. There had to be two different types of baklava, and twenty-four portions in total. For the technical challenge, the bakers had to make a schichttorte, and had two hours to complete it. There had to be twenty layers in their schichttorte, and was one of Paul's recipes. For the showstopper challenge, the bakers had to make entremets, very small and fine cakes put in a window of a French pâtisserie. They had to make two different types of entremets, twelve of each, and had five hours to complete the challenge.

Episode 10: Final 
In the final signature challenge, the bakers had to make Viennoiserie in three and a half hours. They had to make two different types of the pastry. In the technical, the judges decided to bring things "back to basics" by asking the bakers to bake 12 Victoria Sandwiches, Tartes au citron and Scones. The challenge, however, was that they had only two hours to make this and only three instructions. The final Showstopper was a Pièce Montée. The bakers were given five hours to make this, and the judges said it must be in some self-standing structure.

Masterclasses 
Mary and Paul demonstrated how to bake the technical challenges that they set for the bakers as well as their own favorite recipes for some of the other challenges set in the series. They also gave some tips on baking techniques. The Masterclasses episodes were shown on BBC2.

Episode 1

Episode 2

Episode 3

Episode 4

Christmas special

Controversy

"Bingate" 
In the fourth episode of the series, there was controversy over the events that preceded the elimination of contestant Iain Watters. During the final showstopper round contestants were tasked with producing a baked Alaska. Iain's ice cream was shown as having not set, and in a show of frustration, he threw his bake in the bin. The editing of the show suggested that another contestant, Diana Beard, had caused the failure by removing the ice cream from a freezer for her own ice cream, and the perceived "sabotage" resulted in a furore on social media networks.

More than 800 complaints were lodged with the BBC, and some complained to the communication watchdog Ofcom. Some members of the cast, however, posted comments in support of Diana, and a BBC spokesman later issued a statement:

"As shown in the episode, Iain became the fourth baker to leave the tent because he didn't present Paul and Mary with anything to judge in the showstopper challenge and both judges were very clear about the reasoning behind the decision. Due to the extreme temperature in the tent that day, many of the bakers struggled to get their ice cream to set as seen in the episode. Diana removing Iain's ice cream from the freezer for less than a minute was in no way responsible for Iain's departure."

The claim that his dish was only left out for a short time was, however, challenged by Iain Watters, who said that it was left long enough to ruin the dessert.

Fellow contestant Jordan Cox criticized the show's production, claiming the freezers were not very good in quality, and were chosen only for their aesthetics.

Diana Beard left the show before the next episode was filmed due to illness.

Beard later gave an interview to BBC Radio Shropshire: "I'm disappointed with the way it's been portrayed. I've been stitched up, haven't I? We were 12 amateur bakers, [there's] no prize money involved. Why would I sabotage Iain's Baked Alaska? This has made it look like some cutthroat competition. I think someone's culpable for the editing, really."  Beard also said that Iain's ice cream had been out of the freezer for no more than 40 seconds, and that her conscience was clear.

Innuendo 
A number of viewers complained to the BBC feedback show Points of View in the fifth series about the "constant smutty remarks" from the presenters Mel and Sue. This series was seen as having more innuendos than previous ones; some reviewers noted the "extra pinch of saucy spice" and "the increasingly filthy-minded hosts Mel Giedroyc and Sue Perkins", though Series 3 winner John Whaite argued that innuendo is part of what made the show a success, while Paul Hollywood described the innuendo as banter in the spirit of the Carry On films and is a part of British culture, a view shared by others.

Post-show careers 
Richard Burr's book on baking, BIY: Bake it Yourself, was released on 16 August 2015.

Luis Troyano also wrote a book, Bake It Great, released on 20 August 2015. He died of oesophageal cancer in November 2020 at the age of 48.

Chetna Makan has written a baking book The Cardamom Trail, released on 21 March 2016, as well as a cookbook Chai, Chaat & Chutney: A Street Food Journey Through India, published on 6 July 2017. Makan has continued to write cookbooks focused on Indian cooking, with Chetna's Healthy Indian, Chetna's Healthy Indian Vegetarian, and Chetna's 30-Minute Indian published in 2019, 2020, and 2021 respectively.

Martha Collison has written two baking books, Twist, released on 14 July 2016, and Crave, published 13 July 2017 with Harper Collins. She also has a weekly column with Waitrose and is a charity ambassador for Tearfund.

Nancy Birtwhistle released her first book ‘Sizzle and Drizzle’ in 2020. She released her second book, Clean & Green: 101 Hints and Tips for a More Eco-Friendly Home in 2021.

Ratings 
The series started with its highest ratings for its opening episode after its move to BBC One, with over 7 million tuning in according to overnight figures. This is adjusted to 8.5 million for its 7-day final viewing figure, making this its second most-watched episode after previous year's final. In the fourth episode, 8.1 million watched the original broadcast, but the "bingate" controversy gained the show a further 2 million viewers on the BBC iPlayer catch-up service, giving the show the biggest ever audience with 10.248 million viewers for the episode. The final of the show gained an overnight viewing figure of 12.29 million, and a consolidated average figure of 13.5 million, the highest viewing figure for a non-sporting event of the year on UK TV, after 2014 FIFA World Cup's England vs Uruguay match. Series 5 had an average of viewing figure of 10.1 million.

Official episode viewing figures are from BARB.

 The programme was rescheduled to BBC Two in Scotland due to a football game.

Specials

References

External links 
 

Series 5
2014 British television seasons